is a town located in Kanagawa Prefecture, on central Honshū, Japan. , the town had an estimated population of 32,961 and a population density of 1900 persons per km². Since 1894, the Japanese Imperial Family has maintained a residence in Hayama, the seaside Hayama Imperial Villa.

Geography
Hayama is located at the northern end of Miura Peninsula, facing Sagami Bay on the Pacific Ocean. Geographically, it is often cited as the easternmost point of the Shōnan region.

Surrounding municipalities
Kanagawa Prefecture
Zushi
Yokosuka

Climate
Hayama has a Humid subtropical climate (Köppen Cfa) characterized by warm summers and cool winters with light to no snowfall.  The average annual temperature in Hayama is 15.8 °C. The average annual rainfall is 1872 mm with September as the wettest month. The temperatures are highest on average in August, at around 24.6 °C, and lowest in January, at around 6.4 °C.

Demographics
Per Japanese census data, the population of Hayama has grown relatively steadily until around the year 2000 and is now slightly declining.

History
During the Edo period, all of eastern Sagami Province was tenryō territory under direct control of the Tokugawa shogunate, and administered by various hatamoto. With the establishment of the modern municipalities system the early Meiji period in April 1889, the area was reorganized into Hayama village through the merger of six hamlets. Hayama was elevated to town status in 1925.

Government
Hayama has a mayor-council form of government with a directly elected mayor and a unicameral town council of 14 members. Hayama, together with neighboring Zushi, contributes one member to the Kanagawa Prefectural Assembly. In terms of national politics, the town is part of Kanagawa 4th district of the lower house of the Diet of Japan.

Economy
Despite its lack of rail connections, Hayama is now primarily a commuter town for Tokyo and Yokohama and, due to its mild climate, a popular resort area with a marina. From the Meiji period it became a prestigious summer home location for the upper classes of Tokyo, partly due to the prestige of the Imperial villa. In the postwar period, its popularity continued with actors, artists and wealthy expatriates. Local agricultural produce includes shiitake mushrooms, and a brand of beef known as "Hayama-gyu".

Education
Hayama has four public elementary schools and two public middle schools operated by the town government. In addition, the Graduate University for Advanced Studies's main administrative campus is hosted here.

Transportation

Railway
Hayama has no passenger rail service. The nearest train station is the Yokosuka Line Zushi Station or Keikyū Zushi Line Zushi·Hayama Station in neighboring Zushi.

Highway

Sister city relations
 – Kusatsu, Gunma, since March 1969
 – City of Holdfast Bay, South Australia (Australia) since 1997; November 18, 2009, Holdfast Bay wrote a letter signed by their Deputy Mayor admonishing Hayama for Japan's whaling in the Southern Ocean.

Local attractions
Museum of Modern Art, Kamakura & Hayama

Notable people from Hayama, Kanagawa
 Prince Tomohito of Mikasa (1946–2012), member of the Imperial House of Japan and the eldest son of Takahito, Prince Mikasa and Yuriko, Princess Mikasa
 Yasuko Kosuge (born 1974), Japanese former windsurfer
 Sekai (born 1991), singer, dancer and J-pop idol, leader and member of J-pop boygroup Fantastics from Exile Tribe (Real Name: Sekai Yamamoto, Nihongo: 山本 世界, Yamamoto Sekai)
 miwa (born 1990), Japanese singer-songwriter and actress

References

External links

Official Website 

Towns in Kanagawa Prefecture
Populated coastal places in Japan
Hayama, Kanagawa